The Women of Color Film Festival was founded in 1992 and takes place at the University of California at Santa Cruz.

As the longest running event of its kind, the UCSC Women of Color Film and Video Festival has sparked dialogue across communities locally, nationally, and trans-nationally by providing a platform for critical explorations of race, nation, class, gender, ethnicity, and sexuality. It has become a much-anticipated and acclaimed event for its commitment to visual expression, scholarship, and activism.

To date it has shown close to 300 films by women of color as well as hosted workshops and panel discussions with filmmakers, artists, and activists. Past festival participants have included Julie Dash, Cheryl Dunye, Lourdes Portillo, Alma Lopez, and Osa Hidalgo de la Riva.

See also 
 List of women's film festivals

Film festivals in California
University of California, Santa Cruz
Women's film festivals in the United States
Student film festivals
Tourist attractions in Santa Cruz County, California
Organizations for women of color
Women in California
African-American film festivals